Divvy Cloud Corporation is a privately held, venture-backed American cybersecurity company with headquarters in Arlington, Virginia. Its core product protects cloud and container environments from misconfigurations, policy violations, threats, and IAM challenges. DivvyCloud supports AWS, Microsoft Azure, Google Cloud Platform, Alibaba Cloud, and Kubernetes. DivvyCloud is in a category of technology classified by Gartner as cloud security posture management.

History 
DivvyCloud was founded in May 2013 by former Electronic Arts employees Brian Johnson and Chris DeRamus.  During their tenure at Electronic Arts they were responsible for the large-scale infrastructure of MMORPG titles. After writing proprietary tools to manage the complex environment, they left Electronic Arts and created DivvyCloud.

In May 2019, DivvyCloud secured $19 million in a funding round led by Providence Strategic Growth, an arm of Providence Equity Partners, with contributions from existing investors MissionOG and RTP Ventures. This investment brought its total capital raised to date to $29 million, following a $6 million series A round in September 2017.

The company has won numerous awards, including Cyber Defense Magazine Editor's Choice Winner of the 2019 InfoSec Awards in the Cloud Security category  and the 2019 Cyber Security Excellence Awards.

With over 970% growth from 2016 to 2019, DivvyCloud was recognized by Inc Magazine as being one of the 500 fastest growing companies in America.

In April 2020, Rapid7 agreed to acquire DivvyCloud for $145 million. The deal is expected to close during the second quarter of 2020.

References 

Computer security companies
Cloud platforms